Echinus gilchristi, common name Gilchrist's sea urchin, is a species of marine invertebrate in the Echinidae family that usually grows to a diameter of 10 cm.

References

Echinus (sea urchin)
Animals described in 1904